Jae-hui or Jae-hee is a Korean unisex given name. Its meaning depends on the hanja used to write each syllable of the name. There are 20 hanja with the reading "jae" and 24 hanja with the reading "hui" on the South Korean government's official list of hanja which may be registered for use in given names.

People with this name include:
Lee Jae-hee (born 1959), South Korean male football defender
Chung Jae-hee (born 1979), South Korean female badminton player
Song Jae-hee (born 1979), South Korean actor
Jae Hee (born Lee Hyun-kyun, 1980), South Korean actor
Jeong Jae-hee (born 1994), South Korean male football midfielder (K-League Challenge)

Fictional characters with this name include:
Yoo Jae-hee, in 1995–2005 South Korean manhwa series Let Dai
Han Jae-hee, in 2010 South Korean television series Athena: Goddess of War
Goo Jae-hee, in 2012 South Korean television series To the Beautiful You
Han Jae-hee, in 2012 South Korean television series The Innocent Man
Lee Jae-hee, in 2013 South Korean television series When a Man Falls in Love
Song Jae-hee, in 2014 South Korean television series Doctor Stranger
Kwon Jae-hee, in 2015 South Korean television series The Girl Who Sees Smells
Jaehee Kang, in 2016 South Korean mobile video game Mystic Messenger

See also
List of Korean given names

References

Korean unisex given names